The 1990–91 Coastal Carolina Chanticleers men's basketball team represented Coastal Carolina University during the 1990–91 college basketball season. This was head coach Russ Bergman's third season at Coastal Carolina. The Chanticleers competed in the Big South Conference and played their home games at Kimbel Arena. They finished the season 24–8, 13–1 in Big South play to capture the regular season championship. The Chanticleers won the 1991 Big South Conference men's basketball tournament to advance to face Jackson State in a play-in game for the right to advance to the NCAA tournament. Coastal Carolina defeated Jackson state to earn an automatic bid to the 1991 NCAA tournament as No. 15 seed in the Southeast Region, marking the school's first ever appearance in the NCAA tournament. They lost in the first round to Indiana.

Roster

Schedule and results
Source

|-
!colspan=9 style=| Regular season

|-
!colspan=9 style=| Big South tournament

|-
!colspan=9 style=| NCAA tournament

Awards and honors
Tony Dunkin – Big South Conference Men's Player of the Year (2nd of 4)

References

Coastal Carolina Chanticleers
Coastal Carolina
Coastal Carolina Chanticleers men's basketball seasons